Naked and Fearless: Acoustic EP is the eighth EP by American rock band Papa Roach. The EP is only available digitally. It features three acoustic versions of songs from their 2009 album Metamorphosis. The acoustic version of "Had Enough" is featured on the ...To Be Loved: The Best of Papa Roach album.

Track listing

Personnel
 Jacoby Shaddix - lead vocals
 Jerry Horton - guitars, backing vocals
 Tobin Esperance - bass guitar, backing vocals
 Tony Palermo - drums, percussion

References

Papa Roach EPs
2009 EPs
ITunes-exclusive releases